Zoe Ever After is an American sitcom starring Brandy Norwood as Zoe Moon, a recent divorcee who starts her own cosmetics company. The show was Norwood's first leading role in a television series since Moesha (1996–2001) premiered twenty years prior. The show premiered on BET January 5, 2016. It is filmed in Atlanta, Georgia. The series ended on February 16.

Overview
Zoe Ever After centers on Zoe Moon (Norwood), a newly single mom stepping out of the shadow of her famous boxer ex-husband Gemini Moon (Missick) while trying to balance dating, motherhood, a complicated relationship with her ex and finally fulfilling her career dream of starting a cosmetics line. Gordon plays her 8-year-old son Xavier; Smith is Valenté, her fashion-forward and fun assistant; Wood plays Pearl, her publicist and best friend; and Serricchio is sexy contractor Miguel. The show is set in Manhattan, New York.

Cast and characters

Main
 Brandy Norwood as Zoe Moon – Zoe is recently divorced. She tries to balance dating, a complicated relationship with her ex, and motherhood- all while maintaining her entrepreneurship regarding a cosmetics line.
 Dorian Missick as Gemini Moon – Gemini is a famous boxer and the ex-husband of Zoe.
 Ignacio Serricchio as Miguel Maldonado – Owner of "Maldonado Construction, Heating and Air" and Zoe's contractor, hired by Gemini.
 Tory Devon Smith as Valente – Zoe's assistant and friend. 
Haneefah Wood as Pearl – Zoe's publicist and best friend from college. She uses her business knowledge to try to find a husband.
 Jaylon Gordon as Xavier Moon – Zoe and Gemini's eight-year-old son.

Recurring
 Pej Vahdat as Amir – Doorman in Zoe's building.

Guest stars
 India Arie as herself – (Episode 1)
 Jessica White as herself – (Episodes 2 and 4)
 Tatyana Ali as Ashley King (Episodes 6 and 7)
 Jordin Sparks as herself (Episode 7)
 Jasmine Guy as Barbara Jean (Episode 8)
 Thomas Mikal Ford as James Jean (Episode 8)

Episodes

References

External links
 
 

2010s American black sitcoms
2016 American television series debuts
2016 American television series endings
BET original programming
English-language television shows
Television shows filmed in Georgia (U.S. state)